is a Japanese former figure skater. She won four medals on the ISU Junior Grand Prix series (one gold, three silver) and placed fifth at the 2011 World Junior Championships.

Career 
Risa Shoji began skating in 2002. Debuting on the ISU Junior Grand Prix series in autumn 2010, she won medals at both of her assignments — silver in the Czech Republic and gold in Japan. At the JGP Final, her final score was the same as bronze medalist Li Zijun of China but the tie-breaker placed Shoji in fourth. She finished fifth in her senior national debut at the Japan Championships and then fifth at the World Junior Championships.

In the 2011–12 JGP season, Shoji took silver at both of her assignments, Australia and Estonia. She finished sixth at her second JGP Final, sixth at the 2012 Winter Youth Olympics, and 20th at the 2012 World Junior Championships. In 2012, Shoji left her coach Naoki Shigematsu and competed at the 2012 Japanese National Championships without a coach.

Programs

Competitive highlights

Detailed results 

 QR = Qualifying round

References

External links 

 

1996 births
Japanese female single skaters
Living people
Sportspeople from Tokyo
Figure skaters at the 2012 Winter Youth Olympics
20th-century Japanese women
21st-century Japanese women